WPCS may refer to:

 WPCS International, an engineering firm based in Exton, Pennsylvania, United States
 WPCS (FM), a radio station (89.5 FM) licensed to Pensacola, Florida, United States
 West Pictou Consolidated School, a K-8 public school in Nova Scotia, Canada

See also
 WPC (disambiguation)